Grand Hotel is a 1932 American pre-Code drama film directed by Edmund Goulding and produced by Metro-Goldwyn-Mayer. The screenplay by William A. Drake is based on the 1930 play of the same title by Drake, who had adapted it from the 1929 novel Menschen im Hotel by Vicki Baum. To date, it is the only film to have won the Academy Award for Best Picture without being nominated in any other category.

MGM remade the film as Week-End at the Waldorf in 1945. A  German remake, Menschen im Hotel was released in 1959 and also served as the basis for the 1989 Tony Award-winning stage musical Grand Hotel. In 1977, MGM announced a musical remake, to take place at Las Vegas' MGM Grand Hotel and directed by Norman Jewison, but the production was eventually cancelled.

Grand Hotel has proven influential in the years since its original release. The iconic line "I want to be alone", famously delivered by Greta Garbo, placed number 30 in AFI's 100 Years...100 Movie Quotes. In 2007, the film was selected for preservation in the United States National Film Registry by the Library of Congress for being "culturally, historically, or aesthetically significant".

Plot

Doctor Otternschlag, a disfigured veteran of World War I and a permanent resident of the Grand Hotel in Berlin, observes, "People coming, going. Nothing ever happens" — after which a great deal transpires.

Baron Felix von Gaigern, who squandered his fortune and supports himself as a card player and occasional jewel thief, befriends Otto Kringelein, a dying accountant who has decided to spend his remaining days in the lap of luxury. Kringelein's former employer, industrialist General Director Preysing, is at the hotel to close an important deal, and he hires stenographer Flaemmchen to assist him. She aspires to be an actress and shows Preysing some magazine photos for which she posed.

Another guest is Russian ballerina Grusinskaya, whose career is on the wane. When the Baron is in her room to steal her jewelry and she returns from the theatre, he hides in her room and overhears as she talks to herself about wanting to end it all. He comes out of hiding and engages her in conversation, and Grusinskaya finds herself attracted to him. He spends the night with her. The following morning, the Baron returns Grusinskaya's jewels, and she forgives his crime. She invites him to accompany her to Vienna, an offer he accepts.

The Baron is desperate for money to pay his way out of the criminal group he has been working with. He and Kringelein get a card game going, and Kringelein wins everything, then becomes intoxicated. When he drops his wallet, the Baron stashes it in his pocket, intending to keep not only the winnings but the funds that will see Kringelein through the last weeks of his life. However, moved by the sight of  Kringelein’s despair, the Baron – who desperately needs the money, but has become very fond of Kringelein – pretends to have discovered the wallet, and returns it to him.

As part of a desperate merger plan, Preysing must travel to England, and he asks Flaemmchen to accompany him. Later, when the two are in her room—which opens onto his—Preysing sees the shadow of the Baron rifling through his belongings. He confronts the Baron; the two struggle, and Preysing bludgeons the Baron with the telephone, killing him. Flaemmchen sees what happened and tells Kringelein, who confronts Preysing. He insists he acted in self-defense, but Kringelein summons the police, and Preysing is arrested.

Grusinskaya departs for the train station, expecting to find the Baron waiting for her there. Meanwhile, Kringelein offers to take care of Flaemmchen, who suggests they seek a cure for his illness. As they leave the hotel, Doctor Otternschlag again observes, "Grand Hotel. Always the same. People come. People go. Nothing ever happens."

Cast

 Greta Garbo as Grusinskaya, the dancer
 John Barrymore as Baron Felix von Gaigern
 Joan Crawford as Flaemmchen, the stenographer
 Wallace Beery as General Director Preysing
 Lionel Barrymore as Otto Kringelein
 Lewis Stone as Dr. Otternschlag
 Jean Hersholt as Senf, the porter
 Robert McWade as Meierheim
 Purnell B. Pratt as Zinnowitz
 Ferdinand Gottschalk as Pimenov
 Rafaela Ottiano as Suzette
 Morgan Wallace as Chauffeur
 Tully Marshall as Gerstenkorn
 Frank Conroy as Rohna
 Murray Kinnell as Schweimann
 Edwin Maxwell as Dr. Waitz
 Allen Jenkins as Hotel Meat Packer

Production

Producer Irving Thalberg purchased the rights to Vicki Baum's novel Menschen im Hotel for $13,000 and then commissioned William A. Drake to adapt it for the stage.
It opened on Broadway at the National Theatre on November 13, 1930, and ran for 459 performances. Pleased with its success, Thalberg had Drake and Béla Balázs write the screenplay, and budgeted the project at $700,000.
There was some controversy about Greta Garbo, with her strong Swedish accent, playing a Russian.

The film was also seen as an artistic achievement in its art direction and production quality. The art director, Cedric Gibbons, was one of the most important and influential in the history of American film. The lobby scenes were extremely well done, portraying a 360° desk. This allowed audiences to watch the hotel action from all around the characters. It changed the way sets were made from that point onward.

It was the first film to feature brothers Lionel and John Barrymore together. Later in the year, they would join their other sibling, Ethel, in Rasputin and the Empress.

"I want to be alone"
As Grusinskaya, Greta Garbo delivers the line "I want to be alone", and, immediately following, "I just want to be alone." Soon after, in conversation with Baron Felix von Geigern, she says, "And I want to be alone." Referring to its legendary use as a characterization of her personal reclusive life, Garbo later insisted, "I never said I want to be alone; I only said, 'I want to be let alone.' There is all the difference."

Critical reception

Alfred Rushford Greason of Variety comparing the film to the stage production, wrote "[it] may not entirely please the theatregoers who were fascinated by its deft stage direction and restrained acting, but it will attract and hold the wider public to which it is now addressed". He added, "The drama unfolds with a speed that never loses its grip, even for the extreme length of nearly two hours, and there is a captivating pattern of unexpected comedy that runs through it all, always fresh and always pat."

Mordaunt Hall of The New York Times praised the performances of Greta Garbo and John Barrymore, in a mostly positive review. "The picture adheres faithfully to the original", he said, "and while it undoubtedly lacks the life and depth and color of the play, by means of excellent characterizations it keeps the audience on the qui vive."

Film Daily called it an "engrossing drama" that "never lags", and "one of the classiest moving picture affairs you've seen in a long time".

John Mosher of The New Yorker called it a "tricky, clever film", praising Goulding as "a director at last to give Garbo her due" and for his "ingenious" camera work, "relishing, I suspect, the advantages the screen offers in these respects over the stage, where the awkward constant shifting of scenes clogged the action of the play".

The film holds an 86% approval rating on the review aggregationwebsite Rotten Tomatoes, based on 42 reviews, with an average rating of 7.58/10. The site's consensus reads: "Perhaps less a true film than a series of star-studded vignettes, Grand Hotel still remains an entertaining look back at a bygone Hollywood era."

Writing in 2009, Blake Goble of The Michigan Daily called it "the original Ocean's Eleven for its star power", and compared it to Gosford Park "for its dense structure and stories". He added, "[T]he pacing is quick, the acting is eloquent, and the stories are actually interesting. It's pure theatricality. But Hotel lasted thanks to its simplicity, and the star power doesn't hurt either. This is grand, old Hollywood captured on film."

Box office
Grand Hotel was a massive commercial success upon its release. According to MGM records, the film earned $1,235,000 in the U.S. and Canada and $1,359,000 elsewhere, resulting in a profit of $947,000.

Aborted late 1970s musical remake

In his memoir Adventures in the Screen Trade, screenwriter William Goldman recalls being contacted by director Norman Jewison about doing a remake of the film as a musical, to be set at the original MGM Grand Hotel in Las Vegas (now Bally's). It would also be filmed at the hotel, named for the film and opened just four years earlier, where MGM had not yet allowed any filming of its luxurious interiors. Goldman was very enthusiastic, since even though movie musicals were not very popular with studios or audiences at the time, he believed Grand Hotel could be an exception, recalling the classic Hollywood movie musicals of the 1940s and 1950s, with the real interiors of the Grand, never before seen on screen, as their setting. Goldman also worried that he was being seen too much as a screenwriter of thrillers and wanted to show that he was not a genre writer.

MGM executives, initially cooperative, began to have second thoughts about the project once one of them remembered that Jewison had final cut in his contract, meaning the studio could not force him to make changes to the film before release. Goldman characterized their perception of the hotel as "Pristine. Unsullied. The diamond in the Metro crown", and believed they feared the film would not depict the Grand this way, instead focusing on the less glamorous aspects of Las Vegas. Goldman wrote a draft of the script with far more detail than he normally added to make clear that this was not his or Jewison's intention, but the studio was not sufficiently persuaded. As a compromise, they offered Jewison final cut on any material filmed outside the hotel, but not inside. Jewison was unwilling to accept that, and the project fell through.

Four years later, Jewison called Goldman again and said the hotel, now under separate management from the studio, was again interested. Staff at the hotel took Goldman on tours of the building as part of his research. While visiting the suites on the uppermost floors, never rented but instead comped to heavy gamblers and their entourages, he was told that director Hal Ashby had used one for a scene in the then-unreleased Lookin' to Get Out, apparently after Caesar's Palace across the street had refused him permission to use one of their suites.

Goldman and Jewison learned that in the scene Ashby filmed at the Grand, one of the main characters goes into the suite to be fellated by a prostitute while his friend waits outside. This was at odds with the image of the Grand management had gone to great lengths to avoid projecting in 1977. After the 1981 MGM film ...All the Marbles, set in the world of women's professional wrestling, staged its climax at the MGM Grand in Reno, Goldman felt the Grand had lost its mystique and so lost his enthusiasm for working on the film; the project was dropped.

Home media
Warner Home Video released the first Region 1 DVD on February 3, 2004. The film is in 4:3 frame format, with audio tracks in English and French, and subtitles in English, French, and Spanish. Bonus features include Checking Out: Grand Hotel, a documentary about the making of the film; a 1932 newsreel with highlights of the Hollywood premiere; Nothing Ever Happens, a 1933 Vitaphone short film spoofing Grand Hotel; and theatrical trailers.

The 2013 Warner Home Video Blu-ray release of Grand Hotel contains an audio commentary track by film historians Jeffrey Vance and Mark A. Vieira.

References

External links

 
 
 
 
 Grand Hotel essay by Daniel Eagan in America's Film Legacy: The Authoritative Guide to the Landmark Movies in the National Film Registry, A&C Black, 2010 , pages 193-195 

1932 films
1932 drama films
American drama films
American films based on plays
Films based on Austrian novels
Films set in Germany
Films set in Berlin
American black-and-white films
Best Picture Academy Award winners
United States National Film Registry films
Films directed by Edmund Goulding
Metro-Goldwyn-Mayer films
Films set in hotels
Films produced by Irving Thalberg
Films based on adaptations
Articles containing video clips
1930s English-language films
Films about accountants
1930s American films